Flower  is a 2017 American comedy-drama film directed by Max Winkler, from a screenplay by Alex McAulay, Winkler, and Matt Spicer. It stars Zoey Deutch, Kathryn Hahn, Tim Heidecker, Adam Scott, Joey Morgan, and Dylan Gelula.

It had its world premiere at the Tribeca Film Festival on April 20, 2017. It was released theatrically on March 16, 2018, by The Orchard.

Plot
Seventeen-year-old Erica Vandross gives a police officer oral in his patrol car, after which two of her friends sneak up and record them. They extort $400 from the cop as Erica is underage. Erica and her friends are vigilantes who frequently entrap pedophiles. Erica is saving up to bail her father out of prison, where he is awaiting trial for trying to rob a casino.

Erica's mother Laurie is not bothered by Erica's promiscuity, but Laurie is disappointed that Erica does not like Laurie's new boyfriend Bob. Bob has an obese son named Luke, an emotionally disturbed 18-year-old who gets out of rehab and comes to live with them. Erica offers Luke oral sex, which he refuses, but they soon develop an unlikely friendship.

At a bowling alley, Luke has a panic attack when he sees his middle school teacher, Will Jordan, whom he accused of sexual assault. Will was never charged due to inconsistencies in Luke's story. Later that night, Erica interrupts Luke's suicide attempt.

Erica and her posse decide to make Will their next target, and Luke reluctantly agrees to participate. At a grocery store, Erica flirts with Will, and later she approaches him at the bowling alley. Although Will is aware that Erica is underage, they make out in his car in the parking lot. Before things can go any further, she abruptly stops it. Her friends accuse her of sabotaging the plan because she likes Will.

The gang forms a new plan. Erica blows a drug dealer in exchange for roofies and they lace a beer with it. Erica visits Will's house with a six pack, apologizes for the previous night, and they go inside his house to hang out. She asks about a model of the Eiffel Tower on his coffee table, and this prompts him to tell the story of being fired and divorced after he was falsely accused of molestation. Erica slaps the beer out of his hand, but as he feels the strong effect of the roofies, he grabs her arm and she screams. Luke runs in and knocks Will onto the glass coffee table, smashing it. The four of them pick Will up and prop him up on the couch while two of the girls strip down to their underwear and take pictures with him to use as blackmail. Luke worries that Will's breathing is too slow, but they leave, shaken by the encounter. On the way out, Erica sees that the other girls have spray-painted the word "pedophile" on the garage door.

The next morning, police show up at the Vandross house and accuse Erica and Luke of vandalism. They mention that they have not been able to contact Will yet, so Erica and Luke go back to his house to make sure he is okay. They find Will sitting on the couch exactly where they left him and try to shake him awake, but he is dead. He falls over, revealing blood and the Eiffel Tower model impaled in his back. Luke convinces Erica they have to run away to Mexico.

While on the run, Erica looks for reassurance from Luke that Will deserved what happened to him. Luke reveals that he was never molested by Will; he walked in on Will molesting his classmate, but she was afraid to tell anyone, so Luke lied to keep it from happening to anyone else. Luke surprises Erica by driving her to her father's prison and giving her bail money. However, she is heartbroken to find out that he was bailed out a few days ago and did not contact her.

Erica decides she does not want to live life as a fugitive; she wants them to go home and turn themselves in. Luke agrees, but on their way back, a police car tries to pull them over. Erica tells Luke that they cannot get caught before turning themselves in, so they try to lose the police on a dirt road. During the chase, Luke confesses his love for Erica. They give up on the chase, stop the car, and have sex on the ground, where the police find them. One month later, Erica visits Luke in prison shortly before her house arrest begins. Despite their circumstances, they are happy and in love.

Cast

Production
On June 23, 2016, it was reported that Zoey Deutch, Kathryn Hahn, Adam Scott, and Tim Heidecker would star in Flower, directed by Max Winkler from a script by Alex McAulay that was on the 2012 Black List of best unproduced screenplays. Filming was set to begin that summer.

Filming
Filming was completed in 17 days in the San Fernando Valley.

Release
Flower premiered at the 2017 Tribeca Film Festival on April 20, 2017. Shortly after, The Orchard acquired distribution rights to the film. The first trailer teaser was released on December 1, 2017. The film was released on March 16, 2018.

Reception
The film holds an approval rating of 50% on review aggregator website Rotten Tomatoes, based on 74 reviews with an average rating of 5.6/10. The website's critics consensus states, "Flower proves Zoey Deutch can bring even the most preposterously written characters vividly to life—and that she isn't quite enough to carry a fundamentally flawed film." On Metacritic, the film has a weighted average score of 45 out of 100, based on 20 critics, indicating "mixed or average reviews".

References

External links
 
 
 

2017 films
2017 comedy-drama films
2017 independent films
2010s English-language films
2010s teen comedy-drama films
American teen comedy-drama films
Films directed by Max Winkler
Films set in Los Angeles County, California
Films shot in Los Angeles County, California
The Orchard (company) films
2010s American films